New Lima Public Schools is a school district in Lima, Oklahoma, United States. The district contains an elementary school and a combined middle/high school. The district-wide mascot is the falcon. The population of the school is approximately 300.

The current superintendent at New Lima is Mr. Matthews. The high school principal is Rhonda Barkhimer. The elementary school principal is Becky Green.

External links
Official website

Schools in Seminole County, Oklahoma
Public high schools in Oklahoma
Public middle schools in Oklahoma